Kwai Hing is an area of Kwai Chung Town, Hong Kong. The mainly residential area extends to North Kwai Chung in the north and east, Kwai Fong in the south, and Kwai Chung Estate to the west. It is part of the reclamation of Gin Drinkers Bay in 1960s. It is administrated by Kwai Tsing District Council. It is named after Kwai Hing Estate, a public housing estate in Kwai Chung.

Demographics 
According to the 2016 by-Census, Kwai Hing has a population of 18,005. 94% of the population is of Chinese ethnicity, and median monthly domestic household income is HK$ 20,000.

Shopping malls 
New Kwai Hing Plaza
Kwai Chung Centre
Kwai Hing Shopping Centre

Recreation 
Kwai Hing Government Offices
North Kwai Chung Public Library

Education
Kwai Hing is in Primary One Admission (POA) School Net 65, which includes multiple aided schools (schools operated independently of the government but funded with government money); none of the schools in the net are government schools.

Transportation
MTR: Kwai Hing station

References

Kwai Tsing District
Places in Hong Kong
Kwai Chung